SST may refer to:

Arts and entertainment
 SST: Salo-Salo Together, a former Philippine TV show
 Stadium Super Trucks, American racing series

Music
 S.S.T. Band (Sega Sound Team), a Japanese music band
 SST Records, an independent record label
 "S.S.T." (song), song by Prince

Organizations
 SST Inc. also known as ShotSpotter Inc.
 Silicon Storage Technology, Inc, former US semiconductor manufacturer
 School of Science and Technology, high school in Oregon, US
 School of Science and Technology, Singapore
 Special Security Team, a counter-terrorist unit of the Japanese Coast Guard

Athletes
 Sara Sorribes Tormo, Spanish tennis player

Science and technology
 SST (Menter’s Shear Stress Transport), a model used in fluid dynamics
 Salt spray test, a method of measuring corrosion resistance of materials and surface coatings
 Sea surface temperature
 Sea surface topography
 Serum-separating tube, used in venipuncture
 Socioemotional selectivity theory, a life-span theory of motivation
 Solid-state transformer, a type of transformer
 Somatostatin, a peptide hormone
 Stainless steel (a symbol for stainless steel on engineering drawings as per Y14.38–2007)
 Steady state topography, a research methodology in cognitive neuroscience and neuromarketing
 Super Sound Tracing, a demodulation technique for FM tuners by Sony
 Total sum of squares, in statistics
 Small Sugary Treat, a liquid form of Sucrose used in behavioural studies of animals

Computing
 Single Stream Transport, used by DisplayPort
 Structured Stream Transport, MIT data transport protocol

Telescopes
 Solar Submillimeter Telescope, located in the "El Leoncito" Astronomical Complex
 Space Surveillance Telescope, a military telescope located at Exmouth, Western Australia.
 Spitzer Space Telescope, NASA infrared space observatory
 Swedish Solar Telescope

Time
 Samoa Standard Time or Samoa Time Zone
 Singapore Standard Time

Transportation
 SST class blimp
 Supersonic transport, aircraft
 Training Submarines, (US Navy hull classification symbol: SST)
 Mitsubishi SST, a concept car by Mitsubishi
 Twin Clutch SST, a twin-clutch transmission developed by Mitsubishi
 Safe Secure Trailer, see US Office of Secure Transportation
 SST, the National Rail station code for Stansted Mountfitchet railway station, Essex, England

Other uses
 Seed Science and Technology, a journal about seed science published by the International Seed Testing Association
 SST (typeface)
 Swiss Solvency Test, a framework for the regulation of the insurance industry in Switzerland
 Serious Sam: Tormental, a video game by Gungrounds
 Sales and Services Tax, a type of tax in Malaysia